Yeniköy is a village in the Haliliye district of Şanlıurfa Province, Turkey. As of the 1990 census, it had a population of 734. The village is built on top of an archaeological mound where a survey found Early Bronze Age remains.

References 

Villages in Şanlıurfa Province